John Knox  is  a former Australian rules footballer who played with Collingwood in the Victorian Football League (VFL).	

Knox was captain - coach of Yarrawonga in the Ovens & Murray Football League in 1965.

Notes

External links 

1941 births
Australian rules footballers from Victoria (Australia)
Collingwood Football Club players
Living people